The KtbDarija(Literally "WriteDarija") is a project aiming at standardizing the writing of Darija (Moroccan Arabic), to improve literacy rate and make it easier to learn for foreigners. It is double standard that support both Latin and Abjad alphabets. A set of keyboard layouts for writing in these alphabets have also been developed.

The project was started by Moroccan AI researcher Tareq Daouda, when he was a PhD student in Canada, later joined by Nassim Regragui who studied linguistics, and others. In 2010, they started a side project to translate Linux Ubuntu to Moroccan Darija, which was never completed. Members of the group were also heavily involved in the Moroccan Arabic Wikipedia incubator project in its early years.

Alphabet 

 A = A
 B = B
 Ċ = Sh (Like in Shampoo)
 D = D
 E =  or gemination of a consonant directly followed by another one, ex : ĥdem : Work, ĥedem : Use ("literally make work")) 
 F = F
 G = G (Like in Golf)
 H = H (aspirated)
 I = I
 J = J
 K = K
 L = L
 M = M
 N = N
 O = O/OO
 Ĥ = Kh
 Q = Arabic Qaf
 R = R
 S = S
 T = T (Like in Television)
 Ḫ = Ḫ (H Like in Home)
 V = V
 Ġ = Gh
 Ĝ = Vibration of the throat (Arabic Ayn)
 Ṫ = T (Like in What)
 Z = Z
 ' = Glottal stop

References 

Languages of Morocco
Orthography
Moroccan Arabic
Writing systems